Manley Laboratories, Inc. is an American manufacturer of pro audio equipment, including microphones, signal processors, dynamic range processors, equalizers, converters, and specialized mastering products. Manley is located in Chino, California.

Company origins

Recording and film engineer David Manley began designing high fidelity vacuum tube amplifiers in South Africa in 1980. The earliest units he produced were modified LEAK amplifiers. In 1983, the first Vacuum Tube Logic (VTL) tube power amplifiers and preamplifiers went into full-fledged production for the European market in the UK. David, joined by his son Luke introduced the amplifiers to the US market at the 1986 Consumer Electronics Show (CES), where the positive reception convinced them to expand their distribution to the U.S.. Production was eventually moved to Chino, California as Vacuum Tube Logic of America, Inc. and a secondary brand Manley was established in 1988, first producing what was conceived as upper echelon high fidelity vacuum tube power amplifiers and preamplifiers for the high fidelity home market. In 1989, the first products tailored specifically for professional studio use under the Manley brand were created, namely the 60 dB Microphone Preamplifier followed by the Manley Enhanced Pultec Equalizer. By 1993, the Manley brand had expanded, encompassing a complete range of studio products from microphones, dynamic units, equalizers, converters and specialized mastering products. In April 1993, David Manley and Luke decided to part ways, with Luke creating a new company, VTL Amplifiers, Inc., and David (and his wife EveAnna Dauray Manley) opening a new factory, Manley Laboratories, Inc..

Inspired by her stepfather Albert J. Dauray, who had been part owner of vacuum tube amplifier manufacturer Ampeg from 1967―1971, and a Bill Graham lecture she attended while a music student at Columbia University, EveAnna Dauray Manley had traveled to California in 1989, with a few of her stepfather’s business contacts in hopes of getting a job with a guitar amp manufacturer like Crate or Fender, and ended up getting a job at VTL. EveAnna worked her way through every segment of the company, eventually managing the Manley Laboratories, Inc. factory, sales, distribution, and customer service. David Manley eventually moved to France, and on June 10, 1999, EveAnna Dauray Manley officially assumed the duties of President, CEO and sole owner of Manley Laboratories, Inc. when he resigned as President and assigned his share of the company to her.

Timeline of noteworthy products

 1990–1994 Manley 60 dB Mic Preamp
 1990–1997 Manley Reference A to D Converter featuring UltraAnalog ADCs
 1990–present Manley Enhanced Pultec EQ
 1990–present Manley Mid Frequency Pultec EQ
 1990–present Manley Reference Gold Microphone
 1990–present Manley Reference Cardioid Microphone
 1990–present Manley ML10 Tannoy cabinets with The Mastering Lab crossover
 1991–1997 Manley Limiter Compressor Monoblock
 1993–2016 Manley ELOP® Stereo Limiter
 1994–2000 Manley Reference DAC featuring UltraAnalog DACs
 1994–present Manley Stereo Variable Mu® Limiter Compressor
 1994–present Manley 500/200 Watt Monoblock Amplifier
 1996–present Manley VOXBOX® Combo
 1997–present Manley 250/100 Watt Monoblock Amplifier
 1998–present Manley Massive Passive Stereo Equalizer
 1998–2013 Manley STINGRAY® Stereo Integrated Amplifier
 1999–2010 Manley WAVE DAC+Preamplifier
 1999–2013 Langevin (or Manley) Dual Vocal Combo
 2000–present Manley Neo-Classic SP/PP Monoblock Amplifier
 2001–present Manley STEELHEAD® Phono Preamplifier
 2002–present Manley SLAM!® Stereo Limiter and Micpre
 2002–present Manley Neo-Classic 300B Premplifier
 2002–present Manley SNAPPER Monoblock Amplifier
 2003–present Manley MAHI Monoblock Amplifier
 2004–present Manley SKIPJACK® Switcher
 2006–2019 Manley TNT Microphone Preamplifier
 2008–2014 Manley 16x2 Rack Mount Mixers
 2010–present Manley MicMAID microphone+preamplifier switcher
 2012–present Manley CHINOOK Phono Stage
 2014–present Manley CORE®+ Reference Channel Strip
 2015–present Manley FORCE® Four Channel Micpre
 2016–present Manley ELOP®+ Stereo Limiter Compressor
 2016–present Manley Nu Mu Stereo Limiter Compressor
 2017–present Manley Reference Silver Microphone
 2018–present Manley Absolute Headphone Amplifier

References

External links
 Manley Labs Website
EveAnna Manley Interview NAMM Oral History Library (2020)

See also
 Vacuum tube
 Valve audio amplifier

Music equipment manufacturers
Manufacturers of professional audio equipment
Audio amplifier manufacturers
Microphone manufacturers
Manufacturing companies based in California
Companies based in San Bernardino County, California
American companies established in 1988
Technology companies established in 1988
Manufacturing companies established in 1988
Audio equipment manufacturers of the United States